The 2021–22 season was the 109th season in the existence of PSV Eindhoven and the club's 66th consecutive season in the top flight of Dutch football. In addition to the domestic league, PSV Eindhoven participated in this season's editions of the KNVB Cup, the Johan Cruyff Shield, the UEFA Champions League, the UEFA Europa League and the UEFA Europa Conference League.

Players

First-team squad

Players out on loan

Transfers

In

Out

Pre-season and friendlies

Competitions

Overall record

Eredivisie

League table

Results summary

Results by round

Matches
The league fixtures were announced on 11 June 2021.

KNVB Cup

Johan Cruyff Shield

UEFA Champions League

Second qualifying round
The draw for the second qualifying round was held on 16 June 2021.

Third qualifying round
The draw for the third qualifying round was held on 19 July 2021.

Play-off round
The draw for the play-off round was held on 2 August 2021.

UEFA Europa League

Group stage

The draw for the group stage was held on 27 August 2021.

UEFA Europa Conference League

Knockout phase

Knockout round play-offs
The Knockout round play-offs draw was held on 13 December 2021.

Round of 16
The round of 16 draw was held on 25 February 2022.

Quarter-finals
The draw for the quarter-finals was held on 18 March 2022.

Statistics

Appearances and goals

|-
! colspan="18" style="background:#dcdcdc; text-align:center"| Goalkeepers

|-
! colspan="18" style="background:#dcdcdc; text-align:center"| Defenders

|-
! colspan="18" style="background:#dcdcdc; text-align:center"| Midfielders

|-
! colspan="18" style="background:#dcdcdc; text-align:center"| Forwards

|-
! colspan="18" style="background:#dcdcdc; text-align:center"| Players transferred out during the season

|}

Goalscorers

References

PSV Eindhoven seasons
PSV Eindhoven
2021–22 UEFA Champions League participants seasons
2021–22 UEFA Europa League participants seasons